Robert Karlsson (born 3 September 1969) is a Swedish professional golfer who has played on the European Tour and the PGA Tour, and now plays on the PGA Tour Champions.

Early life
Karlsson was born in Katrineholm, Sweden where his father Björn was a greenkeeper at the local golf club. His family lived close to the golf course, just next to the practice green, were Karlsson spent a lot of time. The green was later officially named "Robert's green", written on a plate on a stone nearby.

Amateur career
As an 19-year-old amateur in 1989, Karlsson became the sixth Swedish player to complete all four rounds in The Open Championship, achieved at Royal Troon Golf Club, at his Open debut, playing the last round with defending Open champion Seve Ballesteros and tying Ballesteros at 76th place and second best amateur after sinking a 3-yard putt on the last hole.

The month before, Karlsson represented Sweden at the European Amateur Team Championship, at Royal Portcawl, Wales, and finished tied fourth individually with Peter McEvoy, England, in the stroke-play qualification competition.

Professional career
He turned professional in late 1989 and qualified for membership of the European Tour at the 1990 Qualifying School. Since then he has retained his card and has had a steady career on tour, the highlight of which came in 2008 when he won the Order of Merit. He has finished in the top-20 of the Order of Merit seven times throughout his career and has won 11 events on tour.

With his win at the 1995 Turespaña Open Mediterrania in Spain, the 16th European Tour victory by a Swedish player, Karlsson became the 8th Swede to have won on the European Tour.

At the 2006 Celtic Manor Wales Open, Karlsson broke the European Tour's 36 hole and 54 hole scoring records by shooting 124 for the first two rounds and 189 for the first three. However, as the course was a par 69, which is rare at the top level, his to-par scores were less remarkable 14 under after two rounds and 18 under after three.

Karlsson's second victory of 2006 at the Deutsche Bank Players Championship of Europe in July helped him reach the top 50 of the Official World Golf Rankings and in 2008 he entered the top 25. His win at the Alfred Dunhill Links Championship took him to number 8 in October 2008. A T3 finish at the Portugal Masters two weeks later took him to number 6. He has spent over 25 weeks in the top-10 since 2008.

Karlsson was a member of the Continental Europe team in the Seve Trophy in 2000, 2002 and 2007. In 1999 he was eleventh on the Ryder Cup qualifying table just missing out on the last automatic place, and was not selected as a captain's pick. He made his Ryder Cup debut in 2006, at the age of 37, along with fellow Swede Henrik Stenson. He played again in 2008, forming a partnership with Pádraig Harrington in the foursomes and beating Justin Leonard 5 & 3 in the singles on Sunday.

After a strong finish to the season, Karlsson won the 2008 European Tour Order of Merit, being the first Swedish golfer to do so. This achievement resulted in him winning Swedish Male Athlete of the Year Award at the Swedish Sports Gala in January 2009, also a Swedish male golfer first. After the 2008 season, he also received the Swedish Golfer of the Year award, male and female, for the first time of two during his career. He won the World Cup for Sweden with teammate Henrik Stenson in November 2008. The two of them finished second to United States at their try to defense in the event the year after and received The Team of the Year award at the Swedish Sports Gala in January 2010.

In June 2009, Karlsson suffered from an eye injury, with no depth-perception in his left eye. It occurred during the week of the St. Jude Classic, the week before the U.S. Open, which Karlsson was set to play in, teeing off in the first round with fellow Swede Henrik Stenson. The eye injury caused Karlsson to withdraw from the event and he missed most of the rest of the 2009 season. He returned for The Vivendi Trophy toward the end of the season, and completed his recovery by claiming his tenth Tour title at the 2010 Commercialbank Qatar Masters the following January. In June, Karlsson lost in a sudden death playoff to Lee Westwood at the St. Jude Classic. In 2011, Karlsson was again in a playoff at the St. Jude Classic, where he lost to long-suffering veteran Harrison Frazar.

In May 2017, Thomas Bjørn selected Karlsson as his first vice-captain for the 2018 Ryder Cup, and in September 2019 Pádraig Harrington did the same for the 2020 Ryder Cup.

As Karlsson turned 50 in 2019, he became eligible for the PGA Tour Champions, and qualified for the 2020 season by finishing third at the PGA Tour Champions National Qualifying Tournament in December 2019. His first season on the Champions Tour was, due to the COVID-19 pandemic, prolonged through 2020 and 2021. In his first 23 events, he finished in the top-10 11 times, including two second place finishes.

Karlsson is known as "The Scientist" for his contemplative and analytical style of play.

Personal life
Like many leading Swedish golfers he lives outside his home country, formerly based himself in Monaco and in 2010 moved to Charlotte, North Carolina, United States.

Karlsson is a member of the "Champions for Peace" club, a group of 54 famous elite athletes committed to serving peace in the world through sport, created by Peace and Sport, a Monaco-based international organization.

In 2016, Karlsson supported the creating of a European Challenge Tour event at his old home club Katrineholm Golf Club in Sweden, Swedish Challenge hosted by Robert Karlsson. The tournament took place in 2016, 2017 and 2018. In 2020, the tournament came back and was part of the Swedish Golf Tour and Nordic Golf League.

Amateur wins
1988 Le Peugeut Classic (France)
1989 Le Peugeut Classic (France)

Professional wins (12)

European Tour wins (11)

European Tour playoff record (3–3)

Other wins (1)

Playoff record
PGA Tour playoff record (0–2)

Japan Golf Tour playoff record (0–1)

PGA Tour Champions playoff record (0–1)

Results in major championships

CUT = missed the half way cut
"T" indicates a tie for a place.

Summary

Most consecutive cuts made – 6 (2010 Masters – 2011 U.S. Open)
Longest streak of top-10s – 3 (2008 Masters – 2008 Open Championship)

Results in The Players Championship

"T" indicates a tie for a place

Results in World Golf Championships

1Cancelled due to 9/11

QF, R16, R32, R64 = Round in which player lost in match play
"T" = Tied
Note that the HSBC Champions did not become a WGC event until 2009.

Results in senior major championships

"T" indicates a tie for a place
NT = No tournament due to COVID-19 pandemic

Team appearances
Amateur
European Boys' Team Championship (representing Sweden): 1987
European Amateur Team Championship (representing Sweden): 1989

Professional
Dunhill Cup (representing Sweden): 1992
Seve Trophy (representing Continental Europe): 2000 (winners), 2002, 2007, 2009
World Cup (representing Sweden): 2001, 2007, 2008 (winners), 2009, 2011
Ryder Cup (representing Europe): 2006 (winners), 2008
Royal Trophy (representing Europe): 2007 (winners), 2010 (winners)

See also
2012 PGA Tour Qualifying School graduates
List of golfers with most European Tour wins

References

External links

Swedish male golfers
European Tour golfers
PGA Tour golfers
PGA Tour Champions golfers
Ryder Cup competitors for Europe
Golfers from Charlotte, North Carolina
Sportspeople from Södermanland County
People from Katrineholm Municipality
1969 births
Living people